Fakir Mohan Medical College and Hospital, established in 2018, is a full-fledged tertiary government medical college and hospital. It is located at Balasore, Odisha. This college imparts the degree Bachelor of Medicine and Bachelor of Surgery (MBBS). The hospital associated with the college is one of the largest hospitals in the Balasore district. The selection to the college is done on the basis of merit through National Eligibility and Entrance Test. Yearly undergraduate student intake is 100 from the year 2018. It is the sixth medical college opened by the Government of Odisha in 2018.FMMCH stands at second position after SCBMCH Cuttack in terms of Patients load and Regarded as Second most big hospital and college in Odisha according to Govt of Odisha( published on news paper). It is one of the preferred medical colleges among the new medical colleges, due to close proximity to the main town.

Courses
Fakir Mohan Medical College, Odisha undertakes education and training of students in MBBS courses.

Affiliations
The college is affiliated with the Fakir Mohan University and is recognized by the National Medical Commission.

References

Medical colleges in Odisha
Universities and colleges in Odisha
Educational institutions established in 2017
2017 establishments in Odisha